Shahrak-e Azadi (also Romanized as Shahrak-e Āzādī) is a village in Abdoliyeh-ye Sharqi Rural District, in the Central District of Ramshir County, Khuzestan Province, Iran. At the 2006 census, its population was 40, in 6 families.

References 

Populated places in Ramshir County